"What Kind of Fool" is a vocal duet from 1981 (see 1981 in music) by singers Barbra Streisand and Barry Gibb. The song was written by Gibb and Albhy Galuten.

Background
The songs on the Guilty album were a collaboration between Streisand and all the members of the Bee Gees, including Barry's brothers, Robin and Maurice Gibb. But Barry Gibb played the largest role of the brothers on the album, co-writing and co-producing all of the tracks, appearing on the album cover embracing Streisand, and singing two duets with her. Co-producer Karl Richardson was quoted describing Barry Gibb's contribution to this song: "He did the demo first. Barbra sang to the demo, then he came back and replaced a couple of things after he had heard what she was doing."

Personnel

Charts
Released as the third single from Streisand's album Guilty (1980), "What Kind of Fool" was the third consecutive top ten single from the album in the United States. "Woman in Love" reached number one on the Billboard Hot 100 chart, and the album's title track (also a duet between the two singers) reached number three, both in late 1980. "What Kind of Fool" spent three weeks at number ten on the Hot 100 in March and April 1981. It also spent four weeks atop the Billboard adult contemporary chart.

Glee version
Popular American television series Glee covered this song in 2011 with fictional character Blaine Anderson (as played by Darren Criss). This was featured on their soundtrack album Glee: The Music Presents the Warblers. No episode of the series had featured this version, as it only appeared in the album.

References

1980s ballads
1981 singles
Barbra Streisand songs
Barry Gibb songs
Song recordings produced by Albhy Galuten
Song recordings produced by Barry Gibb
Songs written by Albhy Galuten
Songs written by Barry Gibb
Male–female vocal duets
Pop ballads
CBS Records singles
Columbia Records singles
1980 songs